Bhupal Noble's College (formerly Bhupal Noble's Institute) is a tertiary educational  institution in Udaipur, Rajasthan, India. It was established in 1923 by Maharaj Kumar HH Bhupal Singh ji Bahadur Mewar. 
 
At present it consists of nine colleges and caters to more than 9,000 students in a range of disciplines including Pharmacy, Physical Education, Law, Management, International Travel and Tourism Management, History, Indology, Nursing, General Science, Commerce,  Arts, Drawing and Painting, Home Science, and Computer and Information Technology. Classes are offered in both Hindi and English.

References

External links
 Official website

Educational organisations based in India
Organisations based in Udaipur
Colleges in Udaipur
Educational institutions established in 1923
1923 establishments in India